

Events 
 January–March 
 January 1 – The Stibo Group is founded by Niels Lund as a printing company in Aarhus (Denmark).
 January 13 – The U.S. Congress enacts a law providing for, effective May 1, 1795, a United States flag of 15 stars and 15 stripes, in recognition of the recent admission of Vermont and Kentucky as the 14th and 15th states. A subsequent act restores the number of stripes to 13, but provides for additional stars upon the admission of each additional state.
 January 21 – King George III of Great Britain delivers the speech opening Parliament and recommends a continuation of Britain's war with France.
 February 4 – French Revolution: The National Convention of the French First Republic abolishes slavery.
 February 8 – Wreck of the Ten Sail on Grand Cayman.
 February 11 – The first session of the United States Senate is open to the public.
 March 4 – The Eleventh Amendment to the United States Constitution is passed by Congress for submission to the states for ratification.
 March 11 – Canonsburg Academy (modern-day Washington & Jefferson College) is chartered by the Pennsylvania General Assembly.
 March 12 – General Antoni Madaliński, a commander of the National Cavalry in the Polish–Lithuanian Commonwealth, disobeys an order from the ruling Russian Empire and Kingdom of Prussia imposing demobilization, advancing his troops from Ostrołęka to Kraków.
 March 14 – Eli Whitney is granted a United States patent for the cotton gin.
 March 22 – Congress prohibits American ships from supplying slaves to any nation other than the United States, setting a penalty of forfeiture of the ship and a $2,000 fine.
 March 23 – British troops capture Martinique from the French.
 March 24 – Tadeusz Kościuszko makes his proclamation starting the Kościuszko Uprising against the Russian Empire and Kingdom of Prussia in the Polish–Lithuanian Commonwealth and Prussian Partition.
 March 26 – The U.S. lays a 60-day embargo on all shipping to and from Great Britain.
 March 27
The United States Government authorizes the building of the first six United States Navy vessels; in 1797 the first three frigates,  and  will go into service (not to be confused with October 13, 1775, which is observed as the Navy's Birthday).
The U.S. Senate passes a rule ending its policy of closing all of its sessions to the public.

 April–June 
 April 4 – Battle of Racławice: Polish supporters of the Kościuszko Uprising defeat forces of the Russian Empire.
 April 5 – French Revolution: Reign of Terror – Georges Danton is executed.
 April 17–19 – Kościuszko Uprising – Warsaw Uprising: The Polish people overthrow the Russian garrison in Warsaw.
 April 19 – Britain, Prussia and the Netherlands sign a treaty of alliance against France.
 April 28 – Sardinian Vespers: The people of Cagliari in Sardinia oust the viceroy and his Piedmontese functionaries.
 April 29–May 1 – Battle of Boulou: The French defeat the Spanish and Portuguese forces.
 May 7 – French Revolution: Robespierre establishes the Cult of the Supreme Being as the new state religion of the French First Republic.
 May 8 – French Revolution: Reign of Terror – Chemist Antoine Lavoisier is tried, convicted and executed by guillotine in Paris, on the same day as with 27 co-defendants also associated with the former ferme générale.
 May 18 – Battle of Tourcoing: French troops defeat British forces.
 May 28–June 1 – The Glorious First of June (Battle of Ushant): The British win a crushing tactical victory over the French fleet, but the merchant convoy escorted by the French fleet arrives safely in France.
 June 4–  British troops capture Port-au-Prince in Haiti from the French.
 June 17
 The Anglo-Corsican Kingdom is established.
 Battle of Mykonos: The British Royal Navy captures . 
 June 24 – Bowdoin College is founded in Brunswick, Maine. 

 June 26 – Battle of Fleurus: French forces defeat the Austrians and their allies, leading to permanent loss of the Austrian Netherlands and destruction of the Dutch Republic. French use of an observation balloon marks the first participation of an aircraft in battle.
 June–July – Mount Vesuvius erupts in Italy; the town of Torre del Greco is destroyed.

 July–September 
 July 12 – Horatio Nelson loses the sight in his right eye, in the British Siege of Calvi in Corsica.
 July 13 – Battle of Trippstadt between French forces and those of Prussia and Austria (First Coalition).
 July 13–September 6 – Kościuszko Uprising: Siege of Warsaw – The Polish people resist a siege by armies of the Russian Empire and Kingdom of Prussia.
 July 17 – The sixteen Carmelite Martyrs of Compiègne are executed 10 days prior to the end of the French Revolution's Reign of Terror.

 July 27 (9 Thermidor) – French Revolution – Thermidorian Reaction: Maximilien, Augustin Robespierre  and Saint-Just are arrested on the orders of the French National Convention; they are executed the next day, ending the French Revolution's Reign of Terror.
 August – Colombian Antonio Nariño is denounced as a traitor after he translates and publishes the French Declaration of the Rights of Man and of the Citizen.
 August 1 – Aristocrats in Sweden gather to mourn the demise of coffee after the beverage is forbidden by royal decree.
 August 20 – Battle of Fallen Timbers in Northwestern Ohio: American troops under the command of General Anthony Wayne (nicknamed "Mad Anthony") defeat Native American tribes of the Western Confederacy. 
 August 21 – British troops capture Corsica following the bombardment by Nelson.
 August 29 – Stonyhurst College is finally established as a Roman Catholic school in Lancashire, England, having had several European locations.
 September 10 – The University of Tennessee is established at Knoxville.
 September 23 – France occupies Aachen.
 September 28 – Austria, Britain and Russia ally against France.

 October–December 
 October 2 – Battle of Aldenhoven between French forces and those of Austria.
 October 4 – In the first and only instance of an incumbent United States president leading men into battle, George Washington arrives at Carlisle, Pennsylvania to guide the U.S. Army's suppression of the Whiskey Rebellion.  The rebels soon disperse and the insurrection collapses by the end of the month.
 October 10 – Battle of Maciejowice: Forces of the Russian Empire defeat Polish supporters of the Kościuszko Uprising; Tadeusz Kościuszko is wounded and captured.
 October 22 – Fort Wayne founded in what is now the U.S. state of Indiana.
 November 4 – Battle of Praga: Russian General Alexander Suvorov storms Warsaw in the war against the Polish Kościuszko Uprising and captures Praga, one of its suburbs, killing many civilians.
 November 14 – The first recorded meeting of the Franklin Literary Society is held at Canonsburg Academy (modern-day Washington & Jefferson College).
 November 16 – The Kościuszko Uprising ends in the defeat of Tadeusz Kościuszko and his forces.
 November 19 – The United States and Great Britain sign the Jay Treaty (coming into effect in 1796), which attempts to clear up some issues left over from the American Revolutionary War and secures a decade of peaceful trade between the two nations. Britain agrees to evacuate border forts in the Northwest Territory (roughly the area north of the Ohio River and east of the Mississippi) and thereby end British support for the Indians.
 November 20 – Battle of St-Laurent-de-la-Muga fought between French and Spanish forces.
 December 8 – The Great New Orleans Fire (1794) burns over 200 buildings in the French Quarter.
 December 23 – St. Louis Cathedral, New Orleans is dedicated.

 Date unknown 
 The Ayrshire (Earl of Carrick's Own) Yeomanry, a British Yeomanry Cavalry Regiment, is formed by the Earl of Cassillis at Culzean Castle, Ayrshire.
 The Oban distillery is built in Scotland.

Births 

 January 7 – Eilhard Mitscherlich, German chemist (d. 1863) 
 February  11 – Charlotta Eriksson, Swedish actor (d. 1862) 
 February 20 – William Carleton, Irish novelist (d. 1869)
 February 21 – Antonio López de Santa Anna, Mexican general and President of Mexico (d. 1876)
 March 5 
 Robert Cooper Grier, Associate Justice of the Supreme Court of the United States (d. 1870)
 Joseph Livesey, English temperance movement campaigner (d. 1884)
 April 10 – Matthew Calbraith Perry, American commodore (d. 1858)
 April 11 – Edward Everett, American politician (d. 1865)
 May 17 – Anna Brownell Jameson, British writer (d. 1860)
 May 24 – William Whewell, English scientist, philosopher and historian of science (d. 1866)
 May 27 – Cornelius Vanderbilt, American entrepreneur (d. 1877)
 June 16 – María Trinidad Sánchez, heroine of the Dominican War of Independence (d. 1846)
 July 5 – Sylvester Graham, American nutritionist, inventor (d. 1851)
 July 7 – Frances Stackhouse Acton, British botanist, archaeologist, writer and artist (d. 1881) 
 July 18 – Feargus O'Connor, Irish political radical, Chartist leader (d. 1855)
 July 28 – Charles Longley, Archbishop of Canterbury (d. 1868)
 August 8 – Francesco Puccinotti, Italian pathologist (d. 1872)
 September 24 – Jeanne Villepreux-Power, French marine biologist (d. 1871) 
 November 3 – William Cullen Bryant, American poet (d. 1878)
 November 10 – Robert Towns, merchant, founder of Townsville, Queensland, Australia (d. 1873)

Date unknown 
 Caroline Howard Gilman, American author (d. 1888) 
 Gustafva Lindskog, Swedish athlete (d. 1851)

Deaths 

 January 4 – Nicolas Luckner, Marshal of France (executed) (b. 1722)
 January 6
 Pierre Bouchet, French physician (b. 1752)
 Maurice d'Elbée, French Revolutionary leader (executed) (b. 1752)
 January 8 – Justus Möser, German statesman (b. 1720)
 January 11 – Caroline Townshend, 1st Baroness Greenwich, English peeress (b. 1717)
 January 16 – Edward Gibbon, English historian (b. 1737)
 January 28 – Henri de la Rochejaquelein, French Revolutionary leader (b. 1772)
 January 31 – Mariot Arbuthnot, British admiral (b. 1711)
 February 10 – Jacques Roux, French priest (b. 1752)
 February 12 – Mahadaji Shinde, Maratha emperor of India (1764–1794)
 March 24 – Jacques Hébert, French Revolutionary leader (executed) (b. 1757)
 March 28 – Marquis de Condorcet, French mathematician, philosopher and political scientist (died in prison) (b. 1743)
 April 5
 Georges Danton, French Revolutionary leader (executed) (b. 1759)
 Camille Desmoulins, French Revolutionary leader (executed) (b. 1760)
 Marie-Jean Hérault de Séchelles, French Revolutionary leader (executed) (b. 1759)
 Fabre d'Églantine, French dramatist, revolutionary (executed) (b. 1750)
 François Joseph Westermann, French Revolutionary leader and general (executed) (b. 1751)
 April 13
 Pierre Gaspard Chaumette, French Revolutionary leader (executed) (b. 1763)
 Lucile Duplessis, wife of Camille Desmoulins (executed) (b. 1770)
 April 18 – Charles Pratt, 1st Earl Camden, Lord Chancellor of Great Britain (b. 1714)
 April 23 – Guillaume-Chrétien de Lamoignon de Malesherbes, French statesman (executed) (b. 1721)
 April 27 
 James Bruce, Scottish explorer (b. 1730)
 Sir William Jones, British philologist (b. 1746)
 May 8 – Antoine Lavoisier, French chemist (executed) (b. 1743)
 May 10 – Élisabeth of France, French princess (executed) (b. 1764)
 May 17 – Sir Thomas Dyke Acland, 9th Baronet (b. 1752)
 May 27 – Mary Palmer, English writer (b. 1716)
 June 14 – Francis Seymour-Conway, 1st Marquess of Hertford, Viceroy of Ireland (b. 1718)
 June 17 – Marguerite-Élie Guadet, French Revolutionary leader (executed) (b. 1753)
 June 18
 François Buzot, French Revolutionary leader (suicide) (b. 1760)
 James Murray, British military officer, administrator
 June 19 – Richard Henry Lee, 12th President of the Continental Congress (b. 1732)
 June 25 – Jean-Olivier Briand, French-born Catholic bishop of Quebec (b. 1715)
 June 27
 Wenzel Anton, Prince of Kaunitz-Rietberg, Austrian statesman (b. 1711)
 Philippe de Noailles, French soldier (executed) (b. 1715)
 Victor de Broglie, French soldier (executed) (b. 1756)
 July 13 – James Lind, British pioneer of naval hygiene in the Royal Navy (b. 1716)
 July 17 – John Roebuck, English inventor (b. 1718)
 July 23 – Alexandre de Beauharnais, French politician and general (executed) (b. 1760)
 July 25 
 André Chénier, French writer (executed) (b. 1762)
 Joseph Frye, American general (b. 1712)
 July 28
 Maximilien Robespierre, French Revolutionary leader (executed) (b. 1758)
 Augustin Robespierre, French Revolutionary leader (executed) (b. 1763)
 Louis Antoine de Saint-Just, French Revolutionary leader (executed) (b. 1767)
 Jean-Baptiste de Lavalette, French general (executed) (b. 1753)
 François Hanriot, French Revolutionary leader (executed) (b. 1761)
 August 6 – Henry Bathurst, 2nd Earl Bathurst, British politician (b. 1714)
 August 14 – Jacoba van den Brande, Dutch cultural personality (b. 1735) 
 August 17 – Countess Palatine Elisabeth Auguste of Sulzbach, politically active Electress of Bavaria (b. 1721)
 September 1 – Catherine Théot, French visionary  (b. 1716)
 September 4 – John Hely-Hutchinson, Irish statesman (b. 1724)
 September 15 – Abraham Clark, American signer of the Declaration of Independence (b. 1725)
 September 16 – Hester Bateman, English silversmith (bap. 1708)
 September 25 – Paul Rabaut, French Huguenot pastor (b. 1718)
 October 21
 Francis Light, founder of the British colony of Penang (b. 1740)
 Antoine Petit, French physician (b. 1722)
 November 3 – François-Joachim de Pierre de Bernis, French cardinal, statesman (b. 1715)
 November 9 – Thomas Walker, distinguished Virginia physician, explorer (b. 1715)
 November 15 
 Countess Palatine Maria Franziska of Sulzbach, German aristocrat (b. 1724)
 John Witherspoon, American signer of the Declaration of Independence (b. 1723)
 November 22 
 John Alsop, American Continental Congressman (b. 1724)
 Alison Cockburn, British poet (b. 1712)
 November 28 
 Friedrich Wilhelm von Steuben, Prussian army officer (b. 1730)
 Sir James Tylney-Long, 7th Baronet, English politician (b. 1736)
 December 2 – Johann Gottlob Leidenfrost, German physician (b. 1715)
 December 12 – Meshullam Feivush Heller, Austrian Hasidic author (b. c. 1742)
 December 16 – Jean-Baptiste Carrier, French Revolutionary leader (executed) (b. 1756)

References